Turkey-Quitaque Independent School District is a public school district based in Turkey, Texas (USA).  Located mostly in Hall County, the district extends into portions of Briscoe, Floyd, and Motley Counties, and serves the communities of Turkey and Quitaque.   The district operates one school Valley School.   In 2011, the district was rated "Recognized" by the Texas Education Agency.

References

External links
 Turkey-Quitaque ISD

School districts in Hall County, Texas
School districts in Briscoe County, Texas
School districts in Floyd County, Texas
School districts in Motley County, Texas